Abhava means non-existence, negation, nothing or absence. It is the negative of Bhava which means being, becoming, existing or appearance.

Overview
Uddayana divides Padārtha (Categories) into Bhava (existence) which is real, and Abhava (non-existence) which is not real. Dravya (substance), Guṇa (quality), Karma (action), Samanya (community or generality), Visesa (particularity or partimerity) and Samavaya (inherence) are the marks of existence. Abhava has not been categorically defined by the Vaisheshika School of Hindu philosophy but is of four kinds viz – 1) Pragabhava i.e. Prior non-existence, 2) Pradhvamsabhava i.e. Posterior non-existence, 3) Atyantabhava i.e.  Absolute non-existence, and 4) Anyonyabhava i.e. Mutual non-existence.

 Pragabhava i.e. Prior non-existence, is the non-existence of an effect in its material cause before production; it has a beginning it has an end because it is destroyed by the production of the effect. Without prior non-existence there cannot be an effect.
 Pradhvamsabhava i.e.Posterior non-existence, is the non-existence of an effect by its destruction; as such it has a beginning but no end i.e. it cannot be destroyed.
 Atyantabhava i.e. Absolute non-existence, or absolute negation is non-existence in all times i.e. denial of an absolutely non-existent entity in all times and in all places. It is the state of absolute abstraction.
 Anyonyabhava i.e. Mutual non-existence, is denial of identity between two things, which have specific nature. Negation other than mutual negation is negation of relation.

The process with which the sound value collapses into the point value of the gap existing between the first and the next syllable of the first letter of the Rigveda, Agnim, is Pradhvamsabhava, the silent point of all possibilities within the gap is Atyantabhava, the structuring dynamics of what happens within the gap Anyonyabhava, and the mechanics by which the sound emerges from the point value of the gap i.e. emergence of the following syllable, is Pragabhava; this mechanism is inherent in both syllables.

The Vaisheshika, the Nyaya, the Bhatta Mimamsa and Dvaita schools hold Abhava as a distinct category. Recognised as a reality by the Nyaya school, Abhava is often stated to be the reality of the greatest moment in the pluralistic universe and is connected with Mukti. It is a relative word, for there can be abhava only when previously there is bhava; moreover it is an event occurring in time.  The Nyaya and the Siddhantin maintain that the cognition of abhava is due to perception involving special kind of contact or sense contact. 

Abhava is that unmanifest level from where the concrete Bhava arises or emerges.  Vasubandhu has referred to Sunyata having the characteristic of the own-being of abhava, rather than a characteristic consisting of bhava which Sthiramati observes is in fact not redundant, which means abhava does not negate bhava. Abhava refers to particular entities and not to Being ; it is a theoretical or logical denial of the existence of some particular impossibility.
The acceptance of abhava as an independent padartha having ontological reality of its own is a peculiar feature of Indian philosophical tradition. Dharmakirti considered abhava as an anumana. He had brought in the idea of imaginary presence of that whose absence was apprehended in order to explain the specificity of the absence.

References

Hindu philosophical concepts
Buddhist philosophical concepts